On February 24, 1986, the body of Sherri Rasmussen (born February 7, 1957) was found in the apartment she shared with her husband, John Ruetten, in Van Nuys, California, United States. She had been beaten and shot three times in a struggle. The Los Angeles Police Department (LAPD) initially considered the case a botched burglary and were unable to identify a suspect. Rasmussen's father believed that LAPD officer Stephanie Lazarus, who maintained a relationship with Ruetten, was a prime suspect.

Detectives who re-examined the cold case files in 2009 were eventually led to Lazarus, by then herself a detective. A DNA sample from a cup she had thrown away was matched to one from a bite on Rasmussen's body that had remained in the files. Lazarus was convicted of the murder in 2012 and is serving a sentence of 27 years to life for first-degree murder at the California Institution for Women in Corona.

Lazarus appealed the conviction, claiming the age of the case and the evidence denied her due process. She also alleged that the search warrant was improperly granted, her statements in an interview prior to her arrest were compelled and that evidence supporting the original case theory should have been admitted at trial. In 2015, the guilty verdict was upheld by the California Court of Appeal for the Second District of the state (which includes Los Angeles).

Some of the police files suggest that evidence that could have implicated Lazarus earlier in the investigation was later removed, perhaps by others in the LAPD. Rasmussen's parents unsuccessfully sued the department over this and other aspects of the investigation. Jennifer Francis, the criminalist who found key evidence from the bite mark, unsuccessfully sued the City of Los Angeles, claiming she was pressured by police to favor certain suspects in this and other high-profile cases and was retaliated against when she  brought this to the LAPD's attention.

Background
While an undergraduate at the University of California, Los Angeles (UCLA) from 1978 to 1982, John Ruetten, a mechanical engineering major from San Diego, occasionally dated Stephanie Lazarus, a fellow Dykstra Hall resident and a political science major from Simi Valley, California. Both were avid athletes; Lazarus played on UCLA's junior varsity women's basketball team. Lazarus would steal Ruetten's clothes when he showered and take photographs of him naked while he slept. Ruetten never considered the relationship as anything more than "necking and fooling around." They had sex for the first time after he graduated, when he accepted a job with hard-drive manufacturer Micropolis and she applied to the city's police academy and became a uniformed officer with the Los Angeles Police Department (LAPD) in 1983. In court, he later testified that they had sex "twenty to thirty times" between 1981 and 1984, but that she was never his girlfriend.

Ruetten later met Sherri Rasmussen, a graduate of Loma Linda University who was on a fast career track in critical care nursing. She entered college at 16, and by her late 20s was the director of nursing at Glendale Adventist Medical Center, giving presentations and teaching classes for fellow nurses.

At one point, Lazarus threw Ruetten a surprise party on his 25th birthday, unaware that he had been dating other women or that he had developed a serious relationship with Rasmussen. When she learned he was seriously involved with Rasmussen, Lazarus was despondent. "I'm truly in love with John and the past year has really torn me up," Lazarus wrote to Ruetten's mother in August 1985. "I wish it didn't end the way it did, and I don't think I'll ever understand his decision." In her own journal, she wrote, "I really don't feel like working. I found out that John is getting married." Depressed, Lazarus visited Ruetten at his condo, and the two had sex—"to give her closure", Ruetten testified years later—for what he says was the only time before Rasmussen's death. Later that night, Lazarus awoke a fellow officer she roomed with to commiserate.

During their engagement, Lazarus brought her skis to the apartment that Ruetten shared with Rasmussen and asked him to wax them, and despite Rasmussen's objections, he complied. Rasmussen felt that this was a little strange, since Lazarus was dressed in flattering workout clothes, and after Lazarus left, his fiancée asked if their relationship was truly over. Ruetten convinced her the two were just friends. A few days later Lazarus returned to pick up the waxed skis, in uniform and armed, after he left for work.

Rasmussen was unnerved by these visits and pleaded with Ruetten to tell Lazarus to stop coming by. Ruetten said only that there was nothing to their relationship and that she should ignore Lazarus. According to Nels Rasmussen, Sherri's father, Lazarus later visited Rasmussen at her office to tell her that things were not over between her and Ruetten and told Rasmussen, "If I can't have John, no one else will." Shortly before her death, Rasmussen again confided to her father her fear that Lazarus was stalking her on the street. Ruetten and Rasmussen were married in November 1985.

Crime and investigation
On the morning of February 24, 1986, Ruetten left the couple's condominium on Balboa Boulevard in Van Nuys to go to work. Rasmussen was scheduled to give a motivational speech at work that day, a managerial tactic she did not feel was effective. To avoid it, she told Ruetten she might call in sick, using a back injury she had incurred while doing aerobics the day before as an excuse.

At 9:45 a.m., a neighbor noticed that the Ruettens' garage door was open, with no car visible. Approximately fifteen minutes later, Ruetten made the first of several unanswered calls home over the course of the day. Rasmussen's sister also called without answer. At noon, two men, who the neighbor believed were gardeners in the compound, gave her and her husband a purse that they had found, which turned out to be Rasmussen's. A maid cleaning a nearby unit said she heard something that sounded like two people fighting, and then something falling, at around 12:30 p.m.

When Ruetten returned home in the evening, he found his garage door open and broken glass on the driveway. In addition, he discovered that the BMW he bought for Rasmussen as an engagement gift was missing. Because of Rasmussen's morning plans, he found it strange that she would have later gone out without letting him know. The house's answering machine had not been activated, despite both of them usually activating it when leaving the house unoccupied.

Inside, Ruetten found Rasmussen dead on the living room floor, shot three times. There were signs of a struggle, such as a porcelain vase that had apparently been broken over Rasmussen's head prior to the shooting, a bloody handprint next to the burglar alarm's panic button, and a toppled credenza. It appeared that someone at least had attempted to bind Rasmussen at some point. She had defensive wounds and a bruise on her face that appeared to have been inflicted by the muzzle of a gun. The gun had been fired through a quilted blanket, apparently to muffle the sound. The investigating criminalist also observed a bite mark on Rasmussen's arm and took a swab from it.

Initial investigation
LAPD detectives investigating the case quickly concluded that Rasmussen had been surprised and killed by a burglar. Rasmussen's attire (a bathrobe, nightgown, and underwear) suggested she was not expecting visitors. Although a maid in a neighboring unit reported hearing screaming and fighting earlier in the day, she did not recall hearing gunshots. She thought the whole event had been a domestic dispute and did not call the police. It appeared that the perpetrator had been in the process of taking electronic equipment when Rasmussen came upon them, and as a result, jewelry had been left behind and the vehicle taken as a getaway. The abandoned BMW was recovered a week later; it yielded no new evidence. The only other item that appeared to have been taken from the home was the couple's marriage license.

Lead detective Lyle Mayer did consider other possibilities. He quickly ruled out the grieving Ruetten as a suspect. Ruetten quit his job and moved away from Los Angeles shortly after the murder. Nels Rasmussen and his wife, Loretta, told Mayer about Lazarus's harassment, and that he made a note of it. Ruetten later told police that he and Rasmussen never discussed Lazarus.

Regardless, the police remained focused on the possibility of burglary, especially in light of one reported later in the same area, in which one of the two reported suspects had been carrying a gun, possibly a .38 caliber like the one that had fired the three bullets into Rasmussen that were later identified by experts as Federal .38J Plus-P. Mayer's partner, Steve Hooks, found the bite mark unusual, as bites during struggles are much more commonly inflicted by women, while the majority of burglars are men. However, because men have bitten opponents during fights as well, the burglary theory stood.

Cold case
The suspected burglars to whom detectives ascribed the crime remained at large, despite a follow-up newspaper story eight months later and a reward offered by the Rasmussen family. The LAPD, preoccupied with the violence resulting from gang wars and the crack epidemic plaguing the city at the time, was unable to devote much more attention to the case. The Rasmussens said that detectives at the Van Nuys office were often unhelpful when the family called, hanging up or putting them on hold. A year after the murder, the frustrated family reiterated their offer at a press conference and called for more action. Nels wrote to Daryl Gates, then chief of the LAPD, about the possibility that Lazarus might have been involved. Detectives told him he "watch[ed] too much television." He continued to publicize the reward, and later worked with the short-lived television series Murder One on a segment inspired by the case.

It would have been a struggle for anyone to subdue her in close quarters, and Mayer had told him at one point that the events may have lasted an hour and a half, a long time for burglars primarily after items of value in the home. Further, whoever shot his daughter had fired directly into her chest at close range and taken the trouble to muffle the shot with the quilt, suggesting that the killing was deliberate and not the accidental byproduct of a struggle.

Mayer eventually retired, and the new detective assigned to the case told Nels that he was unable to follow up on Mayer's notes and did not think that any new leads would emerge. Nels was rebuffed again in 1993 when he offered to pay for DNA testing on the evidence from the murder, now that the technology was available; he was told that the police had to have a suspect in order to proceed with testing. Lazarus briefly reunited with Ruetten in 1989; Mayer's notes show that Ruetten had called him and asked if he was absolutely sure there was no evidence linking Lazarus with his late wife's death.

In the meantime, Lazarus continued working with the LAPD; she went on to start her own private investigation firm, Unique Investigations. In 1987, she earned medals, including one gold, at the World Police and Fire Games in San Diego. In 1993, after stints at the department's Drug Abuse Resistance Education and internal affairs divisions, she became a detective. Three years later, she married a fellow officer and adopted a daughter with him, moving back to Simi Valley; at work, she became an instructor at the police academy. Ruetten eventually remarried as well; he did not pressure the police as his former father-in-law had.

In the late 1990s, after DNA testing had become more prominent, the LAPD formed a new unit that looked through the forensic evidence collected from the department's cold case files to determine whether any had the potential for new leads through DNA testing. Among the evidence seen as likely to do so was that collected from the Rasmussen residence. However, it was not until 2004 that another criminalist, Jennifer Francis, was able to analyze it.  Some of the evidence from the Rasmussen case, including that which might have contained the suspect's DNA, was missing, having been collected in 1993 by another detective.

Francis did not find any matches in the Combined DNA Index System database, but did find that the saliva in it had come from a female, undermining the initial detectives' burglary theory. Several years later, Francis claimed that, unusually, she had access to not just the sample but the entire case file, which had been given to her to help her decide which other samples to analyze. Upon discovering that the biter (and likely perpetrator) was female, she reviewed it and came across a report of a "third-party female" who had allegedly harassed the victim at her job and residence before the murder.

Francis asked the detective supervising her if this woman had been investigated, to which he supposedly responded with, "Oh, you mean the LAPD detective." He elaborated that the woman, a former girlfriend of the victim's husband, was in fact a current LAPD detective but "she's not a part of this." He insisted that the case was simply a burglary as the department had long concluded. No other detective would pursue the case, and the evidence went back into the files.

Second investigation
By 2009, crime in Los Angeles had declined enough from its earlier levels that detectives began looking into cold cases to increase their clearance rates. In Van Nuys, Jim Nuttall and Pete Barba reviewed the Rasmussen file and found it interesting enough to be worth pursuing. Because the DNA test pointed to a female suspect, they decided the burglary theory was invalid and they would have to start from the beginning.

Nuttall and Barba looked at the case as a murder, with the burglary staged to throw the police off the trail. Many aspects of the crime were improbable for a break-in, especially one committed in daylight: Rasmussen's jewelry box, an inviting target for a burglar, was in plain view atop her dresser and had not been touched. The condo was in the middle of a gated complex, surrounded by other units from which burglars could have expected to be easily observed. The front door had an alarm warning, and had not been forced open, as it might have been if the putative burglars had not expected anyone to be at home.

Inside, a key aspect of the crime scene was also inconsistent with the burglary theory. At the top of the stairs was a stack of stereo equipment atop a VCR. If, as the evidence suggested, the struggle between Rasmussen and her attacker had begun upstairs and then continued downstairs, that stack would likely have been knocked downstairs and scattered as well. It made more sense to assume that it had been stacked afterwards, when an actual burglar would have fled the scene immediately after the shooting.

The forensics reinforced this theory. On a record player atop the stack was a thumb-shaped bloodstain. It had no print, suggesting whoever left it was wearing gloves to avoid leaving identification. But the blood was Rasmussen's, suggesting the equipment had been stacked after the struggle and shooting. It had been left behind, the detectives realized, to make the crime look like something other than what it really was. From the four bound volumes of the case file they developed a list of five female suspects. Nuttall was taken aback when Ruetten told him over the phone that Lazarus was a police officer. By then, Lazarus had been promoted to a higher level of detective and was working art theft cases as part of the Commercial Crimes Division.

As one of the two detectives in the nation's only full-time unit devoted to that specialty, Lazarus had gained some local media attention when she and her partner had recovered a statue stolen from Carthay Circle. To better understand the field, she told a local newspaper, she had begun learning to paint. Off the job, Lazarus had been active in the Los Angeles Women Police Officers Association and organized childcare for families of officers. She also made chocolate-covered cherries and homemade soap for her neighbors in Simi Valley for Christmas. Since Lazarus was still with the department, Nuttall and Barba realized they would have to proceed carefully. Still, they ranked Lazarus as the least promising of the five suspects, since they read in the files that she and Ruetten had ended any relationship they had had over the summer before the murder.

Nuttall and Barba's investigations soon eliminated all but one of the other women. The other, a former coworker of Rasmussen's who had had some disputes with her, was eliminated by a covertly collected DNA sample. With only Lazarus left, they kept their investigation a closely guarded secret; not only did her husband also work in Commercial Crimes Division as a detective, she may have had other friends who could have tipped her off. If she were the killer, she could have improved her defense; if she were not, then they could have unintentionally smeared a fellow officer who had had an unblemished service record over the course of her career, with no disciplinary investigations or civilian complaints. They referred to her only as "No. 5", worked on the case after hours or behind closed doors, and developed cover stories to explain why they wanted to look at personnel records for one particular officer from 20 years ago.

The detectives began looking into other aspects of Lazarus's life during the mid-1980s. Another detective recalled that, at that time, most LAPD officers had preferred a .38 as their backup or off-duty carry gun; in fact, they were required to purchase only weapons compatible with the Federal Plus-P ammunition that had been used in the murder. State and departmental records showed that Lazarus had indeed owned a Smith & Wesson Model 49 .38 at the time and reported it stolen to Santa Monica police (but not to her own department's armorer) thirteen days after the murder. Since the location where Lazarus had reported it stolen from was near a popular pier, they assumed she had thrown the gun into the Pacific Ocean. Without the weapon, DNA would be the only definite way to connect the crime to Lazarus.

Nuttall and Barba theorized from their own experience about how an LAPD officer would commit a murder. It would be better to do it on a day off, and departmental records showed that Lazarus had indeed been off the day Sherri Rasmussen was killed. Officers would know better than to use their duty gun, since it would have to be disposed of after the crime and the penalties for losing a duty gun or failing to prevent its theft were severe. Instead, it made sense to use a backup gun like Lazarus's .38. Last, a working patrol officer would know how to do just enough to make the crime scene look like an interrupted burglary to satisfy an overworked detective.

Nels told Nuttall about Lazarus's continued contact with his daughter, which had not been in the files, despite him mentioning it frequently during Mayer and Hook's interviews. Realizing that Lazarus was now their prime suspect, the detectives informed their superiors and arranged to discreetly collect a voluntarily discarded DNA sample from her, knowing they could do so without having to get a warrant, which would have let Lazarus know she was under investigation. While off-duty running errands, Lazarus discarded a cup from which she had been drinking, which other police retrieved. A sample was taken from it, which matched the DNA from the bite mark on Sherri Rasmussen.

Arrest of Lazarus
Rob Bub, the homicide detective supervisor at Van Nuys, began letting his senior officers, all the way up to Chief William Bratton, know of the case along with senior prosecutors from the Los Angeles County District Attorney's office. It was transferred to the Robbery-Homicide Division (RHD), which handled many of the department's high-profile cases, including the art theft bureau where Lazarus herself worked. Her arrest was planned carefully. On the day of the arrest in June 2009, dozens of officers arose before dawn. After being briefed on a search warrant they were told would be executed outside the city, but with few details beyond that, they went to wait near Lazarus's home in Simi Valley and that city's Metrolink station, where Lazarus commuted to the city.

A short time later, detectives from the RHD who had been selected for their lack of personal connection to Lazarus called her from the lockup at Parker Center, the department's headquarters. Bratton had ordered that location be used since Lazarus would have to surrender her gun and equipment belt in order to enter it, limiting the possibility she might resist violently when she was arrested (immediately following the interview, as was the plan) or realized that she was the prime suspect. The detectives, Greg Stearns and Dan Jaramillo, told her they had someone in custody who wanted to talk about an art theft.

After Lazarus had checked in her gun and entered the interrogation room, they explained that this was really about some loose ends they were trying to tie up in the Rasmussen case, since her name had come up in the investigation. They claimed they wanted a private setting because, while Ruetten was an old boyfriend, Lazarus had long been married to someone else and they did not want her private life to become the subject of office gossip. Stearns and Jaramillo knew they would have to tread carefully since Lazarus herself was well aware of police interview techniques and her rights to silence and legal counsel, which she could invoke at any time.

They rambled and digressed from the subject at times, sometimes discussing unrelated police business, but eventually came back to Rasmussen. Lazarus claimed to recall little due to the intervening years, but gradually revealed more and more knowledge—including oblique acknowledgements of her visits to the Ruetten condo and a specific encounter at Rasmussen's office—until she accused her colleagues of considering her a suspect. The detectives mentioned it was possible they had DNA evidence from the crime scene, and requested DNA samples from Lazarus. Lazarus declined and thereafter left the room. She was shortly arrested and charged with the murder.

Once she had been arrested, the police officer teams in Simi Valley began searching Lazarus's home and car. In her house they found her journal from the mid-1980s, with numerous mentions of her love for Ruetten and her despondence over his engagement to Rasmussen (and no mentions of her gun having been stolen). Her computer showed that she had searched the Internet for Ruetten's name on several occasions during the late 1990s.

As the investigating detectives had been, many other LAPD officers were stunned at the idea that Lazarus might have murdered someone. Fellow detectives recalled her as vivacious and supportive (although some also recalled that her behavior when angry had led some to refer to her as "Spazarus" behind her back). A case she had been developing from her art-theft work, with elder abuse and real estate fraud aspects, had to be dropped since it was highly unlikely that it could be prosecuted successfully if the lead investigator herself were facing a murder charge.

After her arrest, Lazarus was allowed to retire early from the LAPD; she was held in the Los Angeles County Jail. A bail hearing was not held for almost six months. Judge Robert J. Perry surprised both sides when he set the amount at $10 million in cash, well above what the defense had suggested and more than twice what prosecutors had proposed. The case against Lazarus was very strong, he said, and thus, she might well be at risk to flee the country or obtain weapons through her husband. Lazarus's lawyer, Mark Overland, said the judge did not understand the case well and contrasted the high figure with the $1 million set for Robert Blake and Phil Spector when they were charged with murder. Several months later, her brother claimed she was not receiving adequate treatment for an unspecified cancer while in custody.

Pretrial defense motions
In October, Overland moved to have the entire case dismissed on the grounds that the initial investigators should have identified Lazarus as a suspect but failed to do so. In support, he cited missing aspects of the original file such as recordings of interviews, Sherri Rasmussen's blood toxicology report, as well as a polygraph test Ruetten allegedly failed. The motion noted Nels Rasmussen's belief that Lazarus was a suspect at the time of the murder, and his ensuing efforts to get the LAPD to take that theory seriously. Because of this failure, he argued, Lazarus's due process rights had been adversely affected since the quality of evidence had degraded in the intervening 23 years.

Overland argued that the truth-in-evidence provisions of the California Constitution required that the long delay in bringing charges which adversely affected the quality of the evidence which might otherwise have allowed him to make a better case that there were other suspects, or that the evidence against Lazarus was not as solid as the prosecution claimed, should be considered sufficiently negligent on the state's part to justify dismissing the case. For example, a witness who could have corroborated the prosecution's account of the confrontation between Rasmussen and Lazarus at the hospital had died in 2000. Prosecutors argued in response that Perry was required to apply federal standards, under which such a delay could only be considered prejudicial if it was shown to have been intentional. Perry agreed, and let the case proceed.

Following that denial, Overland moved to quash the search warrants that had been executed on Lazarus's home, vehicle and spaces she utilized at work, and suppress the evidence obtained from them. They were, he argued, based on stale information and did not sufficiently establish a nexus between the places searched and the likelihood of finding evidence there; Lazarus had not moved to her present residence, he observed, until 1994, eight years after the murder, and the affidavit in support of the warrant did not provide any reason why evidence might be found there. At times the affidavit, Overland claimed, was even deceptive, with the submitting detective asserting that the murder weapon might be found there, when Nuttall and Barba had already theorized that Lazarus had reported it stolen two weeks after the murder and irretrievably disposed of it.

Perry admitted he was "uncomfortable" admitting some of the seized evidence, in particular from Lazarus's personal computers and other electronic storage devices at her home, since either she had not had them or they had not existed at the time of Rasmussen's death, but he felt that since an experienced judge had issued the search warrants, the good-faith exception to the exclusionary rule applied and all the evidence obtained could be admitted. Overland's subsequent motion for a Franks hearing, which would have allowed them to cross-examine the detective who had filed the search-warrant affidavit to better determine whether the evidence obtained was admissible, was also denied on the same basis.

Overland's next motion, heard late in 2010, sought to bar the use of statements Lazarus made during her videotaped interrogation at Parker Center. He argued that, per the Garrity warning usually given to government employees under investigation, California law compelled her to answer questions as a police officer or face disciplinary action for refusing to cooperate with an investigation, entitling her to automatic use immunity for those answers. The prosecution argued that that only applied where there was an active administrative proceeding, which had not started against Lazarus until after her arrest. Perry agreed with them on the point that Overland's argument was overbroad.

A year later, Perry denied the last of Overland's significant pretrial motions. The criminalists had used MiniFiler, a new product to type Lazarus's DNA, and he argued it was sufficiently different from previous technology that she was entitled to a Frye hearing, to determine whether its results were of sufficient scientific validity to be admissible. Perry ruled that it was just another form of the PCR method commonly used to test DNA samples.

Trial
The case attracted considerable media attention. Many of its elements—a love triangle with a woman scorned, a cold case unsolved for over 20 years and the accused killer turning out to be a police officer herself—were similar to the plots of popular televised police dramas and reality shows such as Snapped, Scorned: Love Kills and Deadly Women. The Atlantic ran a feature story about the case before the trial, and Vanity Fair ran one by Mark Bowden afterwards.

The trial began in early 2012. In Los Angeles County Superior Court, prosecutors argued Lazarus's motive for the murder was jealousy over Sherri Rasmussen's relationship with Ruetten. In his opening argument, prosecutor Shannon Presby summed up the case as, "A bite, a bullet, a gun barrel and a broken heart. That's the evidence that will prove to you that defendant Stephanie Lazarus murdered Sherri Rasmussen."  A highlight of the case was Ruetten's testimony. Several times, he became emotional and wept, particularly when recalling his courtship of Rasmussen. He allowed that having sex with Lazarus while he was engaged to his future wife was "a mistake".

In cross-examining the police detectives and other technicians who had originally investigated the killing, Overland stressed the original botched burglary theory and pointed to evidence, such as the similar burglary that happened shortly thereafter, that he claimed supported it. He also highlighted evidence that was not analyzed, such as a bloody fingerprint on one of the walls, to suggest that other suspects had not been adequately excluded from consideration. He questioned whether it could be truly inferred from the weapon used that it was Lazarus's lost gun, as .38s were in wide use. Since the DNA from the bite mark was central to the prosecution's case, he attacked it vigorously, pointing to improper storage procedures and a hole the tube had left in an envelope that he said would have allowed Lazarus's DNA to be added to it long after it had been collected.

During the two days in which he presented his case-in-chief, Overland focused on the prosecution's theme of a lovelorn Lazarus, presenting friends of hers who denied that she was showing any signs of violence or despondence over her failed relationship with Ruetten at the time of the murder. Excerpts from a contemporaneous journal were offered as evidence; Lazarus wrote in it of dating several different men, none of them Ruetten. He reinforced his attack on the forensic evidence, calling as his last witness a fingerprint expert who said that some prints at the crime scene did not match those of Lazarus.

Both prosecution and defense reiterated their themes in closing arguments. After showing the jury of eight women and four men photographs of a beaten, bloodied Rasmussen, prosecutor Paul Nunez told them, "It wasn't a fair fight... This was prey caught in a cage with a predator." Overland dismissed the entire case as circumstantial "fluff and fill", save for the "compromised" bite-mark DNA sample. He moved for a mistrial after Nunez reminded the jurors that no alibi had been provided for the time of the murder, since defendants' refusal to testify cannot be held against them, but Perry denied it, saying he did not take that as directly suggesting Lazarus herself had refused to testify and thus her Fifth Amendment right against self-incrimination had not been violated.

In March, after several days of deliberations, Lazarus (then 52) was convicted of first-degree murder. Later that month, she was sentenced to 27 years to life in prison, and she is currently serving her sentence at the California Institution for Women in Corona. After credit for time served before the trial, she will be eligible for parole in December 2034.

Litigation alleging police malfeasance
As evidence was introduced at the trial, it became apparent that not all the evidence available and in possession of the LAPD had been found. Recordings and transcripts of interviews with both Nels Rasmussen and Ruetten that discussed Lazarus were absent from the file, although both remembered them when called to testify, and other aspects of the missing interviews are alluded to in other interviews in the file. The only mention of Lazarus during the initial investigation is a brief note of Mayer's in which he reports that Ruetten had confirmed that she was a "former girlfriend".

Two lawsuits have been filed based on these allegations. One, by Nels and Loretta Rasmussen, has been dismissed as time-barred. The other, a whistleblower suit by criminalist Jennifer Francis (née Butterworth at the time she tested what turned out to be Lazarus's DNA on the bite mark), ended with a judgment in the city's favor. It alleged misconduct in not only the Rasmussen case but other high-profile investigations, and that she and others suffered retaliation and harassment from superiors when they tried to report this and accurately report the results they had found.

Rasmussens
Records also showed that, in 1992, shortly after Nels Rasmussen had offered to pay for DNA analysis on the remaining forensic evidence from the case, all samples other than the bite swab that might have helped to identify an attacker had been checked out of the coroner's office by a detective named Phil Morrill. While this appeared to have been part of the routine transfer of records to the LAPD, the evidence could not be located in department files, suggesting the samples were intentionally lost. Only the bite swab, inadvertently left behind at the coroner's office, remained to connect Lazarus to the crime.

In 2010, the Rasmussens filed a civil lawsuit against the city, the LAPD, Ruetten (named only as an indispensable party without any specific claims), Lazarus and 100 Does. They alleged that the coverup, including the act of allowing Lazarus to periodically review the case file, and the LAPD's hostility towards them, starting on the night after the murder and continuing when they pressed the Lazarus claim throughout the 1990s, amounted to a violation of their civil rights, intentional infliction of emotional distress and fraudulent concealment. They further alleged wrongful death against Lazarus and the Does.

Since the civil-rights claim included a violation of Section 1983, the city successfully petitioned for removal to federal court. After the Rasmussens stipulated to dropping the federal claim with prejudice, waiving the right to any further legal action against the city at that level, they were allowed to refile an amended claim in state court, and did so in 2011. There, the city was found to be immune from liability for all of the claims except the civil rights violation. When the Rasmussens filed an amended complaint consisting of just that, the judge dismissed it because he believed it was barred by their earlier stipulation in federal court.

The Rasmussens appealed. In its response, the city raised the statute of limitations as a defense, something it had not done when the suit was originally filed. The appellate court upheld the suit's dismissal on those grounds, holding that the Rasmussens' time to sue was limited once they broke off contact with the LAPD in 1998; the last year they could thus have filed suit was 2000. The California Supreme Court declined to hear the case in March 2013.

Jennifer Francis
Francis filed her suit late in 2013, following the rejection of her claim by the city and a finding by the state's Department of Fair Employment and Housing that she had a right to sue. She alleged that after finding that the DNA from the bite belonged to a woman, the LAPD detective supervising her verbally steered her away from Lazarus as a suspect, without naming her. When Nuttall called her and told her the Van Nuys detectives were working the cold case and had identified Lazarus as a suspect, she did not share what her supervisor had told her for fear of retaliation.

According to Francis, the Rasmussen case was not the only one in which she believed DNA evidence was being purposefully ignored by the department. She was told "We're not going there" in one case where she suggested comparing a partial profile from one victim with that of a suspect in a string of similar unsolved murders, also from the 1980s. Work she did on the DNA found on Jill Barcomb, believed to have been killed by the Hillside Strangler, revealed instead that she was a victim of Rodney Alcala, another serial killer active around the same time in the Los Angeles area; he was ultimately convicted and sentenced to death in 2010. After she suggested doing DNA analyses of semen found on two teenage girls also believed to be victims of the Hillside Strangler, another detective discouraged her with the words, "We don't want to open that can of worms." A short time later she learned the semen samples had been destroyed; she could not find out why.

At the end of 2009, while prosecutors were preparing for the preliminary hearing in the Lazarus trial, she met with an assistant D.A. and told her about the resistance she had initially encountered over the possibility of Lazarus as a suspect in the Rasmussen murder. Several months later she was called into her supervisor's office and asked to relate those events. A month later, she told Detective Nuttall, who had spearheaded the reinvestigation that led to Lazarus's arrest, as well.

The next month, she was called into her supervisor's office, and told to go to an employee counseling service, an act she knew to be punitive, "because you look stressed." The therapist who spoke with her seemed to Francis to be more interested in finding out what she knew about the Lazarus case and who she might have shared it with. After two sessions in which she declined to share that information, she was again called into her supervisor's office and told she was not cooperating and needed to "talk this out". She told the therapist she was getting a lawyer, after which further sessions were canceled as a "mistake".

Two detectives from RHD interrogated her the next month, July 2010. She told them she was concerned that events leading to Lazarus's arrest in which she was involved had been portrayed differently in the media than she recalled them, putting the department in a more favorable light. Nuttall as well, she recalled, had been placed in an equally difficult position, since he told her that Lazarus may have learned that they had reopened the investigation despite the precautions he and Barba had taken.

In the wake of these events, Francis claims, she was taken off the upcoming Grim Sleeper case despite the work she had done on it, including the DNA sample that had led the police to their suspect. The same detective who had insisted Lazarus was not involved in the Rasmussen killing, she noted, had played a major role in investigating the Sleeper. In another meeting, her supervisor threatened her with more counseling and told her she was "obsessed... emotional" and "shouldn't have said anything". She was transferred to a non-analytical position.

The retaliation continued after Lazarus was convicted, Francis claimed. She faced more retaliatory action from her supervisors, whom she also accused of sexually harassing other female criminalists, and was again transferred. A report from the department's Inspector General on her complaint to Internal Affairs was delayed and appeared to have been reviewed by someone else prior to her receipt of it.

In 2015, the parties made motions to the judge as to what evidence could be heard by a jury at trial. At the beginning of 2017, Superior Court Judge Michael Johnson ruled that Francis could proceed to trial alleging a violation of state labor law. He found there were no triable issues of fact on her claims of harassment, discrimination and retaliation. In April 2019, a jury found for the city.

Appeal
Lazarus filed a lengthy appeal of her conviction in May 2013 with the California Court of Appeal, Second District, Division Four, which has appellate jurisdiction over Los Angeles County's courts. Her attorney, Donald Tickle of Volcano, California, argued that Perry had erred in his rulings for the prosecution on all four pretrial motions Overland had filed. Tickle argued that multiple precedents supported the defense arguments over those of the prosecution, and sometimes directly contradicted them. For example, he argued, Perry had applied the good-faith exception to the detectives' reliance on an admittedly defective search warrant based on the fact that the judge had issued the warrant after reviewing the affidavit. But Tickle pointed to an existing California case, which had expressly held that the state cannot rely purely on the warrant's issuance by a judge to establish sufficient good faith that the search was constitutional.

Tickle also attacked Perry's rulings limiting the defense's ability to put on evidence suggesting the initial botched burglary theory of the crime was more credible than the prosecution claimed. The prosecution had not moved to exclude third-party culpability evidence, despite claiming the initial investigation's conclusion was erroneous during its opening statement, which led Perry to ask if they were conceding that it was. Nevertheless, he told Overland that without "some remarkable similarities" between the burglary that killed Rasmussen and the one that happened nearby later, he would not allow the defense to explore the later burglary, since there were also important dissimilarities.

Perry, Tickle said, had misread the primary California case Overland had relied on as not applying to evidence of third-party culpability, while other cases made clear the statute it interpreted did indeed cover that. That case also imposed a lower standard of admission than "remarkable similarities". The use of a .38 caliber weapon and a similar residence in both burglaries established a strong possibility of a common modus operandi for both crimes, Tickle said.

As a result of this ruling, Overland had been denied the opportunity to cross-examine Mark Safarik, the last prosecution witness and an FBI expert on burglaries, who had testified that the crime scene suggested a staged burglary, as opposed to a real one that had been interrupted in progress. Since the prosecution had told the court at a sidebar prior to Safarik's testimony that they intended to limit their questioning to supporting this theory, Perry similarly limited the defense on cross. However, Tickle argued, since Safarik's own report had considered the other burglary, testimony about that should have been allowed.

Decision
A panel of three judges—Audrey B. Collins, Thomas Willhite Jr. and Nora Margaret Manella—heard oral argument in the case in June 2015. A month later, they reached their decision, unanimously upholding Lazarus's conviction.

The court's primary holding was that Lazarus and her attorneys had failed to establish that Perry's rulings resulted in any prejudice to her ability to mount an effective defense. Manella, writing for the panel, conceded at the outset that Perry had incorrectly agreed with the prosecution that delays resulting from negligence or neglect alone could not be considered prejudicial—in fact, she said, federal and state precedent called for a balancing test when there was evidence that an unintended delay in prosecution might adversely affect the defendant's ability to challenge the state's case.

But in applying it to the instant case, she found that the state's explanations for the delays were reasonable enough, and that in turn Lazarus did not show any reasonable likelihood of prejudice resulting from missing evidence and unavailable witnesses. "[The trial court]'s error did not affect the outcome", Manella wrote, pertaining to the absence of chain of custody records for the evidence. "As [it] observed, the passage of time was more likely prejudicial to the prosecution than the defense."

Perry had also properly denied the defense motion to suppress evidence obtained via the search warrants of Lazarus's home, cars and workspaces, according to Manella, since they were based on reasonable assumptions about possibly incriminating evidence that might still be in those places over two decades after the crime—again, supported by existing state and federal case law. And since none of the information in the search-warrant affidavit was known to be false or shown to have been stated with reckless disregard for its truth, the good-faith exception was validly applied. For the same reason, there was no basis for a Franks hearing.

"Appellant appears to believe that Garrity applies to any statement made by a police officer during an interview conducted by fellow law enforcement officials", Manella wrote with regard to Lazarus's interview. "She is mistaken" since it applies only to information coerced under the threat of termination in explicitly criminal investigations, as opposed to statements given where an officer "had no objectively reasonable basis to believe she was compelled to answer the detectives' questions," as Perry had found, since she had not been ordered to submit to the interview nor were Stearns and Jamarillo in her usual chain of command, or working for the LAPD's internal affairs unit. "The fact that she remained in the room answering questions does not support that she felt compelled, but only that she wished to allay suspicion by avoiding behaving in a manner that suggested guilt."

Manella called Lazarus's argument that, regardless of what did or did not happen in the interview, California law compelled her to answer truthfully or be disciplined, a "novel proposition" that relied heavily on a case decided in 1939, 30 years before Garrity. The judge noted that while that decision was "still good law," it had been limited by Garrity and subsequent corresponding California statutory and case law. "Appellant, herself a former internal affairs officer, would have been aware that in the absence of a formal complaint or the explicit advisement required by [a state precedent], she was under no danger of termination if she refused to cooperate with the detectives." Nor did language in California's Public Safety Officers' Procedural Bill of Rights Act requiring officers to cooperate apply, since courts had previously held it applied only to administrative inquiries, not criminal investigations.

On the issue of the admissibility of the MiniFiler DNA results, the panel agreed with Perry that the technology was not sufficiently different from previous DNA test kits to have required a separate hearing on that issue—or that if it were, the defense had not delivered on its offers to provide sufficient evidence that it was. "[Lazarus] quoted the manufacturer's Website representing that MiniFiler would obtain DNA results from compromised samples that previously would have yielded limited genetic data," Manella observed, "but the fact that the company's marketing material promised that its product was better than other comparable products does not establish that this was a new methodology." And since the defense had not requested either of two specific hearing types on whether the DNA had been handled properly, it could not raise those issues on appeal. Even if it had, the panel held that the DNA evidence was not so critical to the case that its exclusion would have made an acquittal more likely.

Finally, the panel held, Perry properly limited the scope of Overland's cross-examination of Safarik, the FBI burglary expert. The differences between the later burglary nearby—the perpetrators of that crime had waited until the house was apparently empty, taken jewelry and then fled in their own car after being caught in the act—and the apparent one at the Ruetten home outweighed the similarities. "[T]he trial court was well within its discretion in concluding appellant had failed to raise a reasonable inference that the April burglary was in any way connected to Rasmussen's murder", Manella wrote. "Cross-examining Safarik about a specific burglary that occurred on a later date in a different location would have had little bearing on the validity of his opinions and conclusions concerning the Rasmussen crime scene."

Lazarus sought review of the decision by the California Supreme Court, but it declined to hear her case.

See also

Crime in Los Angeles
List of killings by law enforcement officers in the United States prior to 2009

Notes

References

External links 
 Casefile True Crime Podcast: Case 42: Sherri Rasmussen – January 14, 2017
 The Interrogation of Stephanie Lazarus, youtube.com – August 21, 2019

1986 in California
1986 murders in the United States
2012 in California
Deaths by person in California
Deaths by firearm in California
February 1986 events in the United States
Female murder victims
Los Angeles Police Department
Murders by law enforcement officers in the United States
Murder in Los Angeles
Murder trials
20th-century American trials
Van Nuys, Los Angeles